The Austerlitz was a late 100-gun Hercule-class ship of the line of the French Navy.

Service history
Laid down as Ajax, she was renamed Austerlitz on 28 November 1839, still on keel.

In 1850, her rigging was changed for that of a 90-gun, and a steam engine was installed.

On 19 September 1854, she ran aground in the Ledsund, in Åland, Grand Duchy of Finland. She was refloated after throwing sixteen of her cannon overboard. She took part in operations in the Black Sea in 1854. On 16 April 1855, Austerlitz ran aground at South Foreland, Kent, United Kingdom in foggy weather. She was refloated the next day.

From 1871, she was used as a prison hulk of prisoners of the Paris Commune. Between 1874 and 1894, she was used as a school ship. She was eventually broken up in 1895.

References

Bibliography

 Jean-Michel Roche, Dictionnaire des Bâtiments de la flotte de guerre française de Colbert à nos jours, tome I

External links 
 100-guns ships of the line

Ships of the line of the French Navy
Hercule-class ships of the line
Training ships
1852 ships
Crimean War naval ships of France
Maritime incidents in September 1854
Maritime incidents in April 1855